Ch'ŏnju-sa is a Korean Buddhist temple located on the southern slope of Yaksan mountain, in Yongbyon, North Pyongan province, North Korea. It is listed as National Treasure #46 in that country. Founded in 1684 during the mid-Joseon dynasty, the temple today retains its main prayer hall, known as Pogwang Hall (普光殿); the Chonju Pavilion (天柱樓), once known as one of the six most scenic spots in Yongbyon; and several lesser outbuildings, including storage rooms, and dormitories. Many buildings still feature delicate original paintings in a well-preserved state.

See also
National Treasures of North Korea
Korean Buddhism
Korean architecture

References

 http://www.kcckp.net/en/periodic/todaykorea/index.php?contents+2320+2006-10+89+36

Buildings and structures in North Pyongan Province
Buddhist temples in North Korea
National Treasures of North Korea
1684 establishments in Asia